The Capivari River (Portuguese, Rio Capivari) is a river of São Paulo state in southeastern Brazil. It is a tributary of the Tietê River.

See also
 List of rivers of São Paulo
 Tributaries of the Río de la Plata

References

Brazilian Ministry of Transport

Rivers of São Paulo (state)
Tributaries of the Tietê